Caroline Cooper may refer to:

 Caroline Cooper (Hollyoaks), a character from the soap opera Hollyoaks
 Caroline Ethel Cooper (1871–1961), Australian musician and diarist